Leonore Siegele-Wenschkewitz (27 June 1944, Belgard/Pommern – 17 December 1999, Frankfurt am Main) was a German church historian and director of the Evangelische Akademie Arnoldshain.  She was co-editor of the journal Kirche und Israel (during 1986–1993) and of the issue Arbeiten zur kirchlichen Zeitgeschichte.  She was known for her work on anti-Jewish tendencies in Christian theology.

Life

Research areas

Works
Nationalsozialismus und Kirchen. Religionspolitik von Partei und Staat bis 1935 (Tübinger Schriften zur Sozial- und Zeitgeschichte 5), Düsseldorf 1974 (bearbeitete Fassung der Dissertation: Partei, Staat und Kirchen im Dritten Reich. Materialien zur nationalsozialistischen Religionspolitik bis 1935, Tübingen 1972).
"Wurzeln des Antisemitismus in Luthers theologischem Antijudaismus," in: Heinz Kremers (Hrsg.) in Zusammenarbeit mit Leonore Siegele-Wenschkewitz und Bertold Klappert, Die Juden und Martin Luther – Martin Luther und die Juden. Geschichte, Wirkungsgeschichte, Herausforderung, Neukirchen-Vluyn 1985, 21987, 351–367.
"Das Verhältnis von protestantischer Theologie und Wissenschaft des Judentums während der Weimarer Republik," in: Walter Grab, Julius H. Schoeps (Hg.), Juden in der Weimarer Republik (Studien zur Geistesgeschichte 6), Stuttgart und Bonn 1986, 153–178; in English under the title: "The Relationship between Protestant Theology and Jewish Studies during the Weimar Republic," in: Otto Dov Kulka, Paul R. Mendes-Flohr (Hg.), Judaism and Christianity under the Impact of National Socialism, Jerusalem 1987, 133–150.
Verdrängte Vergangenheit, die uns bedrängt. Feministische Theologie in der Verantwortung für die Geschichte, München 1988 (mit Aufsätzen von Jutta Flatters, Dieter Georgi, Eveline Goodman-Thau, Susannah Heschel, Katharina von Kellenbach, Luise Schottroff, Bernd und Marie-Theres Wacker; von Leonore Siegele Wenschkewitz darin der eröffnende Beitrag: Feministische Theologie ohne Antijudaismus, 12–53).
"Protestantische Universitätstheologie und Rassenideologie in der Zeit des Nationalsozialismus. Gerhard Kittels Vortrag 'Die Entstehung des Judentums und die Entstehung der Judenfrage' von 1936," in: Günter Brakelmann, Martin Rosowski (Hg.), Antisemitismus. Von religiöser Judenfeindschaft zur Rassenideologie, Göttingen 1989, 52–75.
with  Gerda Stuchlik, ed.: Frauen und Faschismus in Europa. Der faschistische Körper (Frauen in Geschichte und Gesellschaft 6), Pfaffenweiler 1990.
with Gerda Stuchlik, ed.: Hochschule und Nationalsozialismus. Wissenschaftsgeschichte und Wissenschaftsbetrieb als Thema der Zeitgeschichte (Arnoldshainer Texte 66), Frankfurt a. M. 1990.
"Josel von Rosheim: Juden und Christen im Zeitalter der Reformation," in: Kirche und Israel 6, 1991, 3–16 (Habilitationsvortrag am 9. Mai 1990).
ed., Die evangelischen Kirchen und der SED-Staat – ein Thema Kirchlicher Zeitgeschichte (Arnoldshainer Texte 77), Frankfurt a. M. 1993.
with Carsten Nicolaisen, ed.: Theologische Fakultäten im Nationalsozialismus, Arbeiten zur Kirchlichen Zeitgeschichte B 18, Göttingen 1993. 
Christlicher Antijudaismus und Antisemitismus. Theologische und kirchliche Programme Deutscher Christen (Arnoldshainer Texte 85), Frankfurt a. M. 1994.
"Die Rezeption und Diskussion der Genus-Kategorie in der theologischen Wissenschaft," in: Hadumod Bußmann, Renate Hof (Hrsg.), Genus. Zur Geschlechterdifferenz in den Kulturwissenschaften, Stuttgart 1995, 60–112.
with Doron Kiesel, ed.: Der Aufklärung zum Trotz. Antisemitismus und politische Kultur in Deutschland (Arnoldshainer Texte 100), Frankfurt a. M. 1998.

External links
 
 
 Die Namensgeberin des Leonore Siegele-Wenschkewitz-Preises - Internetseite des Vereins zur Förderung feminstischer Theologie in Forschung und Lehre e. V.

1944 births
1999 deaths
People from Białogard
People from the Province of Pomerania
Christian writers
German historians of religion
20th-century German Protestant theologians
Women Christian theologians
20th-century German historians
German women historians
20th-century German women writers